David Ekerot (born 1 February 1970) is a former professional tennis player from Sweden.  He enjoyed most of his tennis success while playing doubles.  During his career he won 2 doubles titles.  He achieved a career-high doubles ranking of world No. 52 in 1997. 

After his tennis career he became a musician. His most known songs are The Full Life and Burning Books.

Career finals

Doubles (2 titles, 1 runner-up)

External links
 
 

Swedish male tennis players
Sportspeople from Lund
1970 births
Living people
Swedish male musicians